is an inactive volcanic mountain in Hakodate, Hokkaidō, Japan.
 
The mountain is renowned for its view of the surrounding bay and city. The Michelin Green Guide: Japan gave the experience 3/3 stars in a review, placing it as equal to mountain views of Naples and Hong Kong.
The peak is accessible by hiking or by bike, as well as by a regular cable car service.

Geology 
Mount Hakodate is a volcanic mountain that was once separate from the mainland. Around 3,000 years ago, a sandbar connected the island to mainland Hokkaido, creating an isthmus called a tombolo on which downtown Hakodate is now located. The sandbar makes Mount Hakodate a tied island.

See also
 Mount Hakodate Ropeway

References

External links 
 Hakodate Yama - Geological Survey of Japan

Hakodate
Hakodate
Shoals of Japan
Hakodate
Hakodate